Ning Haoxu (born 8 January 2001) is a Chinese footballer currently playing as a forward for Guangzhou.

Career statistics

Club
.

References

2001 births
Living people
Chinese footballers
Association football forwards
Guangzhou F.C. players